Isabel Fernández (born 1980) is a Bolivian journalist and politician.

Isabel Fernández may also refer to:
 Isabel Fernández de Soto (born 1950), Colombian tennis player
 Isabel Fernández (judoka) (born 1972), Spanish judoka
 Isabel Fernandes (born 1985), Angolan team handball player